"Shit on You" also known by the clean versions as either "Sh*t on You" or "S*** on You", is a song by American hip hop group D12. It was their commercial debut single, released on December 5, 2000. It achieved moderate success by reaching the top 10 of the UK Singles Chart. It was not included on the American vinyl, CD, digital, or streaming editions of their 2001 debut studio album Devil's Night, but was included as a bonus track on the cassette version, UK, European, and Australian releases, and on the deluxe version of Eminem's greatest hits album, Curtain Call: The Hits.

Background
The song features references to John Candy, JonBenét Ramsey, Richard Pryor, Steve Stoute, Deebo and Peabo Bryson. Eminem's line referring to the band as "five more zany-actin' maniacs in action" hearkens back to his first album Infinite. Detroit rapper Royce Da 5'9", who at the time was beefing with D12, made a song called "Shit on U" as a diss track using the "Shit on You" beat. Proof, the only group member not to rap in the original song, also utilised the beat in a solo cover version called "Shoot At You" in 2002, available from his website. The song was also a B-side on the follow-up single Purple Pills in some countries.

Music video
The video was shot on location in Detroit, the group performing in various locations around their home city, including Fox Theatre, Brewster-Douglass Housing Projects, the Joe Louis Memorial, Michigan Central Station, Comerica Park, and Runyon Avenue. The entire video is shot in black-and-white, apart from some cutaway sequences, including Bizarre as an abusive alcoholic living in a run-down house, Eminem as an angry old man, a cutscene where Eminem is at his old house and when Proof is with the chicks. Although Proof does not appear in the record, he provides a spoken introduction to the video, and appears alongside his fellow MCs.

Track listing

European CD single and UK Cassette

UK and European Maxi single

American CD single

UK 12" vinyl

American 12" vinyl

Notes
 signifies a co-producer.
 signifies an additional producer.

Charts

Weekly charts

Year-end charts

References 

D12 songs
2000 debut singles
2000 songs
Shady Records singles
Songs written by Eminem
Songs written by Denaun Porter
Songs written by Bizarre (rapper)